A barquentine or schooner barque (alternatively "barkentine" or "schooner bark") is a sailing vessel with three or more masts; with a square rigged foremast and fore-and-aft rigged main, mizzen and any other masts.

Modern barquentine sailing rig

While a full-rigged ship is square-rigged on all three masts, and the barque is square-rigged except for the mizzen-mast, the barquentine extends the principle by making only the foremast square-rigged.  The advantages of a smaller crew, good performance before the wind and the ability to sail relatively close to the wind while carrying plenty of cargo made it a popular rig at the end of the nineteenth century.

Today, barquentines are popular with modern tall ship and sail training operators as their suite of mainly fore-and-aft sails improve non-downwind performance, while their foremast of square sails offers long distance downwind speed and dramatic appearance in port.

Etymology
The term "barquentine" is seventeenth century in origin, formed from "barque" in imitation of "brigantine", a two-masted vessel square-rigged only on the forward mast, and apparently formed from the word brig.

Historic and modern examples

 City of New York, an arctic sailing ship.
 , a sail training ship that capsized and sank on 17 February 2010.
  of Indonesian Navy, launched and commissioned in 1953, a well-known tall ship used for cadet training and ambassador of the sea, sails around the world and visits many countries.
 , commanded by Ernest Shackleton and crushed by ice in the Weddell Sea during the Imperial Trans-Antarctic Expedition of 1914–17.
 , a sail training ship of the Chilean Navy.
 Gazela Primeiro of 1901.
 Juan Sebastián de Elcano
 , a sail training ship based in Fremantle, Australia.
  of 1932, Belgian training ship.
  launched 1989.
 Many smaller ships of the late nineteenth century Royal Navy were rigged as barquentines, including the s.
 Southern Swan, tall ship from 1922 re-rigged as a barquentine from its original rigging as a schooner. Sails on Sydney Harbour for cruises.
 , 1986 youth development training ship.
 Thor-Heyerdahl
 , an experimental design of 1800 that could be worked entirely from the deck.

Notes

References

External links

 
Sailing rigs and rigging
Merchant sailing ship types